Palm house is a term sometimes used for large and high heated display greenhouses that specialise in growing palms and other tropical and subtropical plants.  In Victorian Britain, several ornate glass and iron palm houses were built in botanical gardens and parks, using cast iron architecture. Especially in English-speaking countries outside the British Isles, these are often called conservatories, in the UK mainly a term for small glass structures attached to houses. 

The large example, completed in 1848, in Kew Gardens, London was arguably the first greenhouse to be built on this scale. It was also the first large-scale structural use of wrought iron.  The later Temperate House at Kew is in fact even larger. Other British examples are at Liverpool's  Sefton Park and Stanley Park.  Elsewhere there are the Franklin Park Conservatory in Columbus, Ohio, the Royal Greenhouses of Laeken in Brussels, the Palmenhaus Schönbrunn in Vienna, and many others.

The rounded shapes of Kew were often followed in the 19th century.  Parts of the iron technology there were borrowed from shipbuilding, so the resemblance of many designs to upturned ships in not entirely coincidental. In the 20th century some pyramidal designs and geodesic domes were adopted. The "Tropical Pyramid" at the Muttart Conservatory in Alberta (c, 1976) and Eden Project in England are respectively examples of these shapes.  The term "palm house" tends not to be used, though the function of the buildings remains the same.

History

The palm house was a stage in the 19th-century development of glass and iron architecture, which was also widely used in railway stations, markets, exhibition halls, and other large buildings needing a large and open internal area. It was planned by Henry Phillips as a visitor attraction by itself, with Amon Henry Wilds as the architect; both were local men from Brighton and Hove. However, it collapsed the day before its official opening in 1830.  

One of the earliest examples of a palm house is located in the Belfast Botanic Gardens. Designed by Charles Lanyon, the building was completed in 1840. It was constructed by iron-founder Richard Turner, who would later build the Palm House at Kew in 1848, to a design by Decimus Burton; this is 62 feet high and 362 long.  This came shortly after the Chatsworth Great Conservatory (1837-40; 67 feet high and 277 long, demolished in 1920) and shortly before The Crystal Palace (1851), both designed by Joseph Paxton, and both now lost.

Notes

References
Pevsner, Nikolaus. A History of Building Types, Thames and Hudson, 1976 (1984 edn), ISBN 0500271747

External links
 A Tropical Getaway: Polish Palm Houses

Greenhouses